Telamonini is a tribe of treehoppers in the family Membracidae. There are about 9 genera and at least 50 described species in Telamonini.

Genera
These nine genera belong to the tribe Telamonini:
 Archasia Stål, 1867 c g b
 Carynota Fitch, 1851 c g b
 Glossonotus Butler, 1877 c g b
 Heliria Stål, 1867 c g b
 Palonica Ball, 1932 c g b
 Telamona Fitch, 1851 c g b
 Telamonanthe Baker, 1907 c g b
 Telonaca Ball, 1918 c g b
 Thelia Amyot & Serville, 1843 c g b
Data sources: i = ITIS, c = Catalogue of Life, g = GBIF, b = Bugguide.net

References

Further reading

External links

 

Hemiptera tribes
Smiliinae